Christopher Bovett (born 25 December 1945) is a British-American former professional tennis player.

Born in Worcestershire, Bovett was educated at Harrow High School. In the mid-1960s, after being unable to secure special coaching from the LTA, he emigrated to Australia to work as a freelance photographer. He secured a scholarship in 1966 to Pan American College (Texas), transferring from there to the University of Houston, where he met his wife Karen. He featured in main draws at the Australian and US national championships while based in both countries. A longtime resident of the Houston area, he was a 2014 inductee into the Texas Tennis Hall of Fame.

References

External links
 
 

1945 births
Living people
British male tennis players
English male tennis players
English emigrants to the United States
Tennis people from Worcestershire